The prime minister of Abkhazia is the de facto head of government of the partially recognized Republic of Abkhazia, that is de jure part of Georgia.

History

Government of President Vladislav Ardzinba

While the presidency was held by one man – Vladislav Ardzinba – from 1994 to 2005, the position of prime minister changed hands a number of times during that time. It was created with the November 1994 adoption of the Constitution of Abkhazia, and Gennady Gagulia was appointed to the position in January 1995.

Government of President Sergei Bagapsh

After Sergei Bagapsh succeeded Ardzinba to the presidency in February 2005, he appointed Alexander Ankvab as Prime Minister. Ankvab was Bagapsh's vice presidential candidate in the 12 December 2009 presidential election, and as required by law, he was officially suspended from his post on 11 November and his duties were carried out by First Vice Premier Leonid Lakerbaia. Bagapsh and Ankvab won the election, and on 13 February 2010, Ankvab was succeeded by long-time minister for foreign affairs Sergei Shamba.

Government of President Alexander Ankvab

After Alexander Ankvab defeated Sergei Shamba in the 2011 presidential election, Leonid Lakerbaia became Prime Minister.

On 2 June 2014, Lakerbaia resigned as a result of the Abkhazian Revolution and Vice Premier Vladimir Delba was appointed acting prime minister.

Government of President Raul Khajimba

The 2014 presidential election was won by opposition leader Raul Khajimba, who on 29 September 2014 appointed Beslan Butba as the new prime minister. However, there were rumors of Butba's resignation almost since the beginning of his term, explained variously by a power struggle between Butba and Khajimba and by Butba's supposed bad performance as Prime Minister. Butba was finally dismissed by President Khajimba on 16 March 2015, and temporarily replaced by First Vice Premier Shamil Adzynba. In a press conference afterwards, Butba said that he had made Khajimba aware of his intention to resign. He claimed that the presidential administration had taken over many of the responsibilities of the prime minister, creating a 'second government'. On 20 March, Khajimba appointed MP and former United Abkhazia chairman Artur Mikvabia as Butba's successor.

Following a pending motion of no-confidence against him, the storming of the Interior Ministry by opposition activists and a failed referendum to bring about an early presidential election, Mikvabia announced his resignation as Prime Minister on 26 July 2016, accepted on the same day by Khajimba. In an interview with Caucasian Knot, Mikvabia stated that the strong unrest in society was being caused by the government's efforts to structurally improve the financial situation of Abkhazia through measures such as the introduction of VAT, that he did not want to work under conditions where society itself hindered development and that he hoped his resignation would defuse tensions. Khajimba again appointed Adzynba as acting prime minister. On 5 August, he appointed newly-appointed presidential administration head Beslan Bartsits as the new Prime Minister.

List of prime ministers of Abkhazia

See also

President of Abkhazia

References

Politics of Abkhazia
Abkhazia, Prime Minister of